Nathaniel Mountain is a mountain ridge that runs southwest northeast through Hampshire County in West Virginia's Eastern Panhandle, rising to its greatest elevation of  above sea-level. The mountain is bound at its western flank by the South Branch Potomac River and to its eastern flank by South Branch Mountain . The bulk of Nathaniel Mountain is located within the Nathaniel Mountain Wildlife Management Area (WMA) owned by the West Virginia Division of Natural Resources.

The rugged topography of Nathaniel Mountain and its WMA is dominated by mature oak and hickory forests with Virginia pine. The mountain also supports a habitat for a variety of neo-tropical migratory birds and two wetlands identified by The Nature Conservancy. Nathaniel Mountain's forested wetlands are a unique find at such a high elevation. The wetlands include a number of plant species not common in the region, including sphagnum moss (Sphagnum andersonianum) and the cinnamon fern (Osmunda cinnamomea). White-tailed deer, wild turkeys, squirrels, black bears, and grouse may be pursued by hunters on the mountain. Nathaniel Mountain's Mill Run serves as a habitat for native brook trout and rainbow trout.

References 

Ridges of Hampshire County, West Virginia
Ridges of West Virginia